Khrustalny is an urban locality (an urban-type settlement) in Kavalerovsky District of Primorsky Krai, Russia, located  from the district's administrative center of Kavalerovo. Population:  Postal code: 692426. Urban-type settlement status was granted to Khrustalny in 1954.

References

Urban-type settlements in Primorsky Krai